The following is a list of persons who have attended the Oslo Freedom Forum (OFF) conferences since its start in 2009. The list is categorized first by country of origin, then by profession and year.

Afghanistan
Sima Samar (Chairperson of the AIHRC) (2010)
H.E. Manizha Bakhtari (Afghan Ambassador to Norway) (2010)
Roya Mahboob (Afghan tech entrepreneur and founder of Citadel Software) (2016)

Argentina
Uki Goñi (Argentinian journalist) (2011)
Victoria Villarruel (Argentinian lawyer) (2011)

Australia
Julian Assange (Wikileaks Founder) (2010)

Austria
Michael Fleischhacker (editor, Austria's Die Presse) (2011)

Azerbaijan
Emin Milli (writer and activist) (2016)
Leyla Yunus (Azerbaijani human rights activist) (2018)

Bahrain
Maryam al-Khawaja (Bahraini rights activist) (2011)

Bangladesh
Ahmedur Rashid Chowdhury (publisher, writer, and editor from Bangladesh) (2017)

Belarus
Svetlana Tikhanovskaya (Leader of the Belarusian democratic movement) (2020)
Zhanna Litvina (Belarusian journalist) (2011)
Aliaksandr Bialiatski (Belarusian democracy activist and opposition leader) (2009)

Belgium
Andrew Stroehlein (communications director, International Crisis Group) (2011)

Brazil
Fernão Lara Mesquita (Brazilian journalist) (2011)

Britain
Justine Hardy (British journalist and mental health expert) (2011)
Nick Cohen (British journalist and author) (2012)
Sarah, Duchess of York(2009)
Benedict Rogers (author and East Asia team leader, Christian Solidarity Worldwide) (2011)
Philippa Thomas (BBC anchor) (2011)
Shiraz Maher (Expert on Islamic extremism) (2015)
Saad Mohseni (British-born chairman and chief executive of MOBY GROUP) (2015)
Chris Turner (award-winning stand-up comedian) (2017)
Clare Rewcastle Brown (British activist) (2018)
Tiff Stevenson (British stand-up comedian) (2018)

Bolivia
Victor Hugo Cardenas (former vice-president of Bolivia) (2009)

Burma
Zoya Phan (Burmese activist) (2011)
Wai Hnin Pwint Thon (Burmese Activist) (2021)

Burundi
 Gilbert Tuhabonye (Burundian genocide survivor, author, and athlete) (2010)
 Pierre Claver Mbonimpa (Burundian prison reformer) (2010)

Cambodia
Sophal Ear (scholar of the Cambodian genocide) (2010)
Somaly Mam (Cambodian author and human rights activist) (2012)
Mu Sochua (Cambodian politician and rights activist) (2018)

Canada
Irwin Cotler (former Canadian Minister of Justice and Attorney General) (2012)
Maziar Bahari (Iranian Canadian journalist and human rights activist) (2018)
Emmanuel Jal (Sudanese Canadian performer, writer and political activist) (2018)

Chad
Jacqueline Moudeina (head of the Chadian Human Rights Commission) (2009)

Chechnya
Lidia Yusupova (Chechen lawyer) (2010)
Akhmed Zakayev (prime minister in exile, Chechnya) (2011)

Chile
Andés Velasco (Chilean economist and former finance minister) (2015)

China
Jung Chang (author, Wild Swans) (2009)
Rebiya Kadeer (President, World Uyghur Congress) (2010)
Yang Jianli (Chinese dissident) (2011)
Harry Wu (Chinese dissident) (2009)
Wan Yanhai (Chinese HIV/AIDS activist) (2011)
Hui Siu Fun (producer, Hong Kong's Pearl and Jade TV) (2011)
Grace Gao (daughter of Gao Zhisheng, dissident Chinese human rights lawyer) (2017)
Fang Zheng (Chinese dissident) (2018)
Chung Ching Kwong (Hong Kong Political & Digital Rights Activist) (2021)

Colombia
Victor Diusaba (online director, Colombia's El Semana) (2011)
Belisario Betancur (former president of Colombia) (2011)
Clara Rojas (Colombian politician, formerly kidnapped by the FARC) (2010)

Cuba
Yoani Sanchez (Cuban blogger) (via video) (2010)
Armando Valladares (former Cuban political prisoner) (2010)
Guillermo Fariñas Hernández (Cuban psychologist, journalist, and political dissident) (2017)
María Payá Acevedo (Political dissident) (2016)
Tania Bruguera (Cuban Artist) (2021)

Czech Republic
Václav Havel (former Czech President) (via video) (2009)

Denmark
Jacob Mchangama (Danish scholar) (2011)
Torstein Nybo (co-producer, Burma VJ) (2010)

Ecuador
Guadalupe Llori (Ecuadorian politician) (2010)
Xavier Bonilla (Ecuadorean political cartoonist for leading newspaper El Universo) (2017)

Egypt
Mona Eltahawy (award-winning Egyptian journalist) (2010)
Wael Ghonim (Egyptian internet activist) (2011)
Bassem Youssef (Egyptian satirist and television host) (2014)
Soraya Bahgat (Egyptian-Finnish women's rights advocate and founder of Tahrir Bodyguard) (2013)
Omar Sharif Jr. (grandson of film star Omar Sharif, actor, model, and LGBT rights activist) (2016)
Wael Ghonim (Egyptian internet activist and entrepreneur) (2018)

Eritrea 

 Filmon Debru (Eritrean Human Tracking Survivor) (2021)

Estonia
Mart Laar (former Prime Minister, Estonia) (2010)

Finland
Soraya Bahgat (Egyptian-Finnish women's rights advocate and founder of Tahrir Bodyguard) (2013)

France
Philippe Douste-Blazy (former foreign minister of France) (2011)

Gabon
Marc Ona Essangui (president and founder of two organizations in Gabon) (2015)

Germany
Peter Thiel (co-founder, PayPal) (2010)
Daniel Domscheit-Berg (founder, Openleaks) (2011)
 Siegmar Faust (German author) (2010)

Ghana
George Ayittey (Ghanaian economist) (2011)
Anas Aremeyaw Anas (undercover journalist) (2017)

India
Vincent Manoharan (Indian Dalit rights advocate) (2011)
Kenan Malik (Indian-born English free expression advocate) (2015)

Iran
Kambiz Hosseini (Iranian satirist, actor, and television and radio host) (2015)
Maryam Faghihmani(Iranian human rights scholar and activist) (2015)
Marina Nemat (former political prisoner, Iran) (2010, 2011)
Shirin Ebadi (Iranian Nobel Laureate) (2011)

Iraq
Vian Dakhil (Iraqi parliamentarian) (2017)
Omar Mohammed (Iraqi Historian - Founder of Mosul Eye) (2018)
Ahmed Albasheer (Iraqi Comedian) (2021)

Israel
Dana Weiss (anchor, Israel's Channel 2 News) (2011)
Essam Daod (Israeli Psychiatrist) (2021)

Latvia
Vytautas Landsbergis (former Latvian President) (2009)

Liberia
Samuel Kofi Woods (Minister of Public Works, Liberia) (2010)
Leymah Gbowee (Liberian activist) (2011)

Libya
Ghazi Gheblawi (Libyan writer) (2011)
Alaa Murabit (Libyan human rights activist and founder of NGO) (2015)
Asma Khalifa (Libyan women's rights and peace activist) (2018)

Malawi
Memory Banda (Malawian girls’ rights activist) (2017)

Malaysia
Anwar Ibrahim (Leader of the Opposition, Malaysia) (2010)
Nurul Izzah Anwar (Malaysian politician) (2015)

Maldives
Mohamed Nasheed (human rights and environmental activist - the Maldives’ first democratically elected president, serving from 2008 to 2012) (2017)

Mauritania
Abdel Nasser Ould Yessa (founder, Mauritania's SOS Slaves) (2011)

Mexico
Sandra Rodriguez Nieto (Mexican journalist) (2015)

Morocco
Ahmed Benchemsi (Moroccan journalist) (2011,12)
Zineb El Rhazoui (Moroccan born journalist) (2015)

Nicaragua 

 Berta Valle (Nicaraguan journalist and human rights activist) (2021)

Nigeria
Wole Soyinka (Nigerian playwright and poet) (2016)
DJ Switch (Nigerian Artist) (2021)

North Korea
Kang Chol-hwan (author, Aquariums of Pyongyang) (2010)
Park Sang Hak (North Korean democracy activist) (2009)
Ji Seong-Ho (North Korean refugee and president of a North Korean NGO) (2015) 
Grace Jo (North Korean defector, activist, and the vice president of North Korean Refugees in the USA (NKinUSA) (2017)
Yeonmi Park (North Korean defector and expert on the country's black market economy) (2014)

Norway
Børge Brende (Foreign Minister of Norway and former managing director of the World Economic Forum) (2015)
Åsne Seierstad (author, The Bookseller of Kabul) (2010)
Knut Olav Amas (political editor, Norway's Aftenposten) (2011)
Hanne Skartveit (political editor, Norway's Verdens Gang) (2011)
Magne Ove Varsi (indigenous rights leader) (2009)
Peder Lunde (Norwegian Olympic medallist) (2009)
Kai Eide (U.N. Special Representative to Afghanistan and Head of UNAMA) (2010)
Arne L. Lynngård (president of the Rafto Foundation) (2009)
Jan Egeland (director, Human Rights Watch Europe) (2011)
Jan Erik Helgesen (president, Venice Commission) (2010)
John Peder Egenaes (secretary general, Amnesty International Norway) (2009)
Therese Jebsen (executive director, Rafto Foundation) (2010)
Fabian Stang (mayor, City of Oslo) (2011)
Kjell Magne Bondevik (former Norwegian Prime Minister) (2009,10)
Kristin Clemet (former education minister) (2009,10)
Erna Solberg (current Norwegian Prime Minister of Norway) (2017)

Pakistan
Asma Jahangir (leading Pakistani lawyer) (2012)
Mukthar Mai (Pakistani women's rights advocate) (2010)
Maria Toorpakai Wazir (professional Pakistani squash player and women's rights activist) (2017)

Palestine
Izzeldin Abuelaish (Palestinian doctor) (2011)
Iyad El-Baghdadi (Palestinian writer from the Arab Spring) (2014)

Peru
Hernando de Soto (Peruvian economist) (via video) (2010)
Alejandro Toledo (former president of Peru) (2011)

Poland
Lech Walesa (former Polish president; Nobel Laureate) (2010)

Republic of Azerbaijan
Malahat Nasibova (Azeri journalist) (2011)

Republic of Malawi
Violet Banda (Malawian youth radio host) (2011)

Romania
Elie Wiesel (author, Night) (via video) (2009)
Emil Constantinescu (former president of Romania) (2009,10,11)

Russia
Elena Kostyuchenko (Russian journalist and LGBT rights advocate) (2015)
Grigory Shvedov (Russian journalist) (2011)
Mark Belinsky (Digital Democracy) (2010)
Garry Kasparov (Russian chess grandmaster and democracy advocate) (2010, 2011)
Vladimir Bukovsky (former Soviet political prisoner) (2009, 2010)
Vladimir Kara-Murza (Russian opposition activist) (2016)
Zhanna Nemtsova (Russian journalist, social activist) (2017)
Mikhail Khodorkovsky (Russian entrepreneur) (2014)
Alexey Navalny (Russian Activist) (2021)

Saudi Arabia
Manal al-Sharif (women's rights activist) (2012)

Serbia 

 Srdja Popovic (Serbian political activist and founder of Otpor!)

Singapore
Chee Soon Juan (Singapore Democratic Party leader) (2012)

Somalia
Lelya Hussein (psychotherapist, writer, specialist on female genital mutilation and gender rights) (2017)

South Africa
Andrew Feinstein (former South African politician) (2012)
Busi Kheswa (South African LGBT activist) (2011)
Lebogang Mashile (South African actress and poet) (2018)

Spain
Maria Antonia Sánchez-Vallejo (foreign editor, Spain's El Pais) (2011)

Sudan
Amir Ahmad Nasr (Sudanese blogger) (2011)
Erik Hersman (co-founder, Ushahidi software) (2011
Lubna al-Hussein (Sudanese women's rights advocate) (2010)

Swaziland
Thulani Maseko (human rights lawyer) (2016)

Sweden
Claes Arvidsson (foreign editor, Sweden's Svenska Dagbladet) (2011)
Birgitta Ohlsson (Swedish Minister for European Union Affairs) (2010,11)

Syria
Raed Fares (pro-democracy activist) (2017)
Abdulrahman Al-Mawwas (co-founder of the Syrian Civil Defense) (2017)

Thailand
Pravit Rojanaphruk (Persecuted Thai journalist and dissident) (2015)
Netiwit Chotiphatphaisal (Student Activist of Chulalongkorn University) (2018)
Rap Against Dictatorship (rap artist group & political activists) (2019)
Thanathorn Juangroongruangkit (Thai opposition leader) (2021)

Tibet
Palden Gyatso (former Buddhist prisoner of conscience) (2009)

Tunisia
Amira Yahyaoui (Founder of Al Bawsala, a Tunisian NGO) (2015)
Lina Ben Mhenni (Tunisian activist) (2012)

Turkey
Leyla Zana (former Turkish political prisoner) (2009)
Mustafa Akyol  (Turkish author and journalist) (2015) 
Elif Shafak (Turkish novelist) (2017)
Hatice Cengiz (Turkish Activist) (2021)

Uganda
Kasha Nabagesera (Ugandan rights activist) (2010)

Uruguay
Luis Almagro (lawyer, diplomat, and 10th Secretary General of the Organization of American States) (2017)

United Arab Emirates
Iyad El-Baghdadi (human rights activist, Palestinian Emirati internet commentator) (2014)

United States
Jack Dorsey (Twitter and Square CEO) (2020)
Gulchehra Hoja (Uyghur Journalist) (2020)
Larry Diamond (political science professor at Stanford University) (2015)
Kimberley Motley (American human rights advocate and litigator practicing in Afghanistan) (2015)
Barbara Demick (author, journalist, and North Korean expert) (2011)
Benjamin Skinner (author, A Crime So Monstrous) (2010)
Claudia Rosett (columnist, Forbes magazine) (2010)
David Andelman (editor, World Policy Journal) (2011)
Greg Mortenson (co-author, Three Cups of Tea) (2009)
Jackson Diehl (deputy editorial page editor, Washington Post) (2011)
Sara Bronfman (American Human Rights Activist in Libya) (2009)
James Traub (contributing writer, The NYT Magazine) (2010)
Jay Nordlinger (senior editor, National Review) (2011)
Jamie Kirchick (writer-at-large, Radio Free Europe) (2011)
Thomas Glave (American author, professor, Jamaica activist) (2011)
John Fund (columnist, Wall Street Journal) (2011)
Michael C. Moynihan (senior editor, Reason magazine) (2010)
Paul Steiger (chairman, Committee to Protect Journalists) (2011)
Reihan Salam (columnist, Daily Beast) (2011)
L. Craig Johnstone (Deputy High Commissioner for Refugees, United Nations) (2009,11)
Mona Eltahawy (Egyptian-American analyst) (2011)
James Fallon (neuroscientist) (2011)
Steven Levitsky (Harvard political scientist) (2011)
Jack Healey (former executive director, Amnesty International) (2009)
James O'Neill (Thiel Foundation, Clarium Capital) (2011)
Jared Genser (president, Freedom Now; legal counsel for Liu Xiaobo) (2010, 2012)
Kate Hughes (Women for Women International) (2010)
Mauro de Lorenzo (VP for Freedom and Free Enterprise, John Templeton Foundation) (2010)
Paula Schrifer (director of advocacy, Freedom House) (2010)
Zuhdi Jasser (President and Founder, American Islamic Forum for Democracy) (2010)
Jimmy Wales (founder, Wikipedia; via video) (2010,11)
Ebele Okobi-Harris (director of business and human rights, Yahoo) (2011)
Amber Lyon (CNN correspondent) (2011)
Jody Williams (Nobel laureate) (2011)
Colin Crowell (internet technology policy expert) (2015)
Liza Donnelly (writer/ cartoonist, The New Yorker, CBS News) (2016, 2017)
Joe Lonsdale (American tech entrepreneur, investor, and philanthropist) (2017)
Carah Faye (American singer and songwriter) (2017)
Galia Benartzi (American tech entrepreneur) (2018)
Jason Silva (Venezuelan American television personality) (2018)
Rick Doblin (American psychedelic drug advocate) (2018)

Uzbekistan
Mutabar Tadjibayeva (former Uzbeki political prisoner) (2009)

Venezuela
Marcel Granier (Venezuelan journalist) (2010)
Diego Arria (former President of the U.N. Security Council) (2010)
Leopoldo Lopez (opposition leader, Venezuela) (2010)
Ramón José Velásquez (former Venezuelan president) (via video) (2009)
Rayma Suprani (Venezuelan political cartoonist) (2015)
Antonietta Ledezma (Venezuelan human rights activist) (2017)
Wuilly Arteaga (Venezuelan violinist and activist) (2017)
Antonio Ledezma (Venezuelan politician) (2018)
Leopoldo Lopez (Venezuelan politician) (2021)

Vietnam
Thich Quang Do (Vietnamese religious leader) (via video) (2010)
Vo Van Ai (Vietnamese human rights activist) (2009)

Western Sahara
Aminatou Haidar (human rights activist) (2016)

Yemen
Abdulkarim Al-Khaiwani (Yemeni journalist) (2010)

Zimbabwe
 Jestina Mukoko (Zimbabwean human rights activist) (2012)
 Evan Mawarire (Civil rights activist, founder of #ThisFlag movement) (2017)

References

External links
Official site
OsloFreedomForum's Channel on YouTube

Human rights-related lists
International conferences